Arrest of a suspect in Sarajevo, also erroneously known as The arrest of Gavrilo Princip, is a photograph capturing the arrest of a suspect moments after the assassination of Archduke Franz Ferdinand of Austria and his wife Sophie in Sarajevo on 28 June 1914.

The photograph was sold worldwide as an image of the arrest of assassin Gavrilo Princip and contributed greatly in stirring up patriotic fervour that brought together allied nations into the First World War. It first appeared on the 5 July 1914 front cover of Austrian weekly newspaper . Several scholars believe that the person  apprehended in the photograph is not Princip, but an innocent bystander named Ferdinand Behr, as it has been known since the 1930s. The image became an icon of the 20th century after being publicised as depicting Princip's arrest.

Background
On 28 June 1914, the heir to the throne of the Austro-Hungarian Empire, Archduke Franz Ferdinand and his wife Sophie were assassinated, shot at close range from a crowded sidewalk while visiting Sarajevo, the provincial capital of Bosnia-Herzegovina, occupied by Austria-Hungary since 1878 and formally annexed since 1908. The shooter, Gavrilo Princip, a teenage Bosnian Serb member of Mlada Bosna, an organisation of Serbs, Croats and Muslims dedicated to free Bosnia of Austria-Hungarian rule and unite all Southern Slavs, was arrested immediately and with him numerous other suspects.

The assassination awakened inter-ethnic tensions and pogrom-like anti-Serb riots broke out encouraged in some instances by the Austro-Hungarian authorities. Bosnian Muslim violence against Serbs in Sarajevo and other parts of Bosnia and Herzegovina as well as violence by Croats against Serbs resulted in schools, houses and restaurants demolished and shops looted. Governor Potiorek of Bosnia, who had been responsible for the security of the Archduke and his wife, ordered the arrest of all supposedly suspect Serbs in Bosnia; in the first forty-eight hours after the assassination, more than two hundred leading Serbs were arrested and taken to prison in Sarajevo alone, by the end of July 5,000 Serbs had been jailed, of whom about 150 were hanged. All the conspirators were arrested except Muhamed Mehmedbašić, a Bosnian Muslim, who managed to escape to Montenegro; for political reasons the Austrian police investigators did not chase him as they needed to emphasise the exclusively Serbian nature of the assassination plot. Three terrorists Princip, Cabrinović and Grabez were sentenced to twenty years' imprisonment, avoiding capital punishment because of their age, three others received jail terms and five were hanged.

There is no record of the act itself but "numerous press illustrations of little reliability but great imagination”. One photograph in particular, depicting the arrest of a suspect in Sarajevo, has been reproduced time and again, in the following weeks, months and years, in books and articles, claiming to depict the arrest of murderer Gavrilo Princip.

Photograph

Description
This photograph belongs in the context of the murder of Archduke Franz Ferdinand and his wife. It depicts a dishevelled young man in a dark suit, being dragged away towards the entrance of a building, presumably a police station. In the foreground armed Austro-Hungarian gendarmes hold back a group of Bosnian Muslims, recognisable by their traditional costumes of fezzes, short waistcoat and Turkish trousers, from attacking the prisoner while bystanders standing across the street look on. According to Professor of Art History Rebecca Houze, the diversity of dress displayed contributes to a sense of chaos and agitation in the moment, and reminds us of the roots of the assassination in ethnic tension and nationalistic conflict.

Identity of the main subject 
The image has been published in countless school and history books, up to the present day under headlines like The Man Who Began The Great War and description calling it "the unique photograph showing the arrest of Princip, the Serbian student, immediately after he had assassinated the Archduke Franz Ferdinand of Austria and his wife at Sarajevo on June 26  1914”. It has been recommended for teachers to use in class as "The arrest of Gavrilo Princip . . . an example of photographs that have helped to shape our image of Europe in the 20th century". It has been listed as one of the World's Best Photographs in 1940 and in Photos that Changed the World in 2006 with the caption Arrest of Archduke Ferdinand’s assassin. It is therefore alleged that the main subject of the photograph is the assassin Gavrilo Princip being arrested immediately after the fatal shooting.

On 29 March 1955 an article in the Yugoslav journal Republika uncovered that Princip could not be the man being arrested in the photograph. In 1966 an investigation by the Yugoslav historian Vladimir Dedijer (1914–1990) for The Road to Sarajevo, a reference book dedicated to the assassination of the Archduke Ferdinand by Gavrilo Princip, also concluded that the subject of the photograph was not Princip.

Modern scholars agree that the picture does not show the arrest of Princip but of one of his friends of who had nothing to do with the assassination. According to the research of Austrian photographic historian, Dr. Anton Holzer, Ferdinand Behr was a young man caught up in the sweep of arrests and one of numerous suspects arrested following the shooting. While trying to defend Gavrilo, unaware that he was the assassin, he too was arrested and dragged to the police station suspected of being involved in the assassination.

According to Sunday Times journalist David James Smith the young man was photographed on the way to the station and the photograph has been reproduced many times claiming to depict the arrest of Gavrilo Princip, but James Smith insists that there is no photograph of Princip's arrest and that the photograph shows the arrest of Behr. British journalist Tim Butcher spent three years researching Princip's life, from 2011 to 2014. At the end of his investigation Butcher also confirmed that the subject apprehended in the image was Ferdinand Behr. Butcher calls it "the famous picture that so many historians, journalists and archivists . . . wrongly believed to show the actual assassin being led away. A statement written by Behr in 1930, years after the image was taken, expressed his surprise to be confused with Princip who was much slighter and shorter than him.

According to Christopher Clark, Regius Professor of History at the University of Cambridge, given the technological development of photography in 1914, if somebody had managed to get a snapshot like this of the arrest of Princip, "it would be nothing short of a miracle". Clark explained that, a couple of days after the assassination and the capture of Gavrilo Princip, the Police tipped off the photographer about an upcoming arrest. In order to make a large profit from its syndication, the photographer subsequently decided to sell the image captioned as “The arrest of Gavrilo Princip”.

Since the statement of Ferdinand Behr in 1930, it has been known that the person arrested in the photo was not the assassin Princip, but his school friend Behr.

The photo agency Getty Images sells a few versions of the photograph of the arrest, one of them with the following caption: "The arrested man previously thought to be Gavrilo Princip . . . is now thought to be one of his six co-conspirators Nedeljko Cabrinovic". After purchasing the image from Getty Images  Life Magazine published it in LIFE Secret Societies with the caption: "Cabrinovic is arrested, a photo long erroneously thought to depict Princip". Another version for sale by Getty is captioned : "Picture taken on June 28 1914 of Serb terrorist Gavrilo Princip (2ndR) upon his arrest after the assassination of Archduke Franz Ferdinand".

Author of the photograph 
The Viennese center for historical photography, Photoinstitut Bonartes, identified the author as Austrian photographer Walter Tausch, the owner a studio called  (Sarajevo Photographic Art Institute) on Kulovica Street in Sarajevo. Tausch moved to Sarajevo on behalf of the Austro-Hungarian government in 1910 and immediately opened his studio. Tausch was the professional photographer who had captured the arrival of the Archduke and the Duchess in Ilidža, on their arrival into Bosnia at the train station, the greeting of the Duchess Hohenberg by the head of the state at Hotel Bosna in Ilidža, the departure of the couple from the city hall of Sarajevo after the first bomb attack, a few minutes before the fateful revolver attack on 28 June 1914, the journey through the streets in an automobile, including the scene of the first (bomb) attack by Nedeljko Čabrinović, and right after the assassination attempt, the escorting of the murderer Gavrilo Princip and his comrades to prison. Walter Tausch is widely credited as the professional photographer who took pictures at the scene of the assassination. , names Tausch as president of the “Association of Professional Photographers” from Bosnia and Herzegovina and that his professional reputation explains why he was able to secure an accreditation as an official photographer for the duration of the Archduke's visit to Sarajevo, and why he is most likely the author of the image of the arrest. According to Christoph Hamann the photographer of the canonical photo of the arrest of the alleged assassin was known by name since the Österreichs Illustrierte Zeitung credited Walter Tausch in its 5 July 1914 issue.

In some sources, the names Charles Trampus or Philipp Rubel are mentioned as photographers of the picture. In 1971 the postcard was presented in issue 3 of the German monthly magazine  with the following legend: "Philipp Rubel: Capture of Gavrilo Princip after the assassination attempt on Archduke Franz Ferdinand, Sarajevo, June 28, 1914". In 1983 American photo historian Helmut Gernsheim published the picture with the same legend in his book "History of Photography"'. According to Holzer, Charles Trampus was the owner of Paris-based photo agency "Press Agency Trampus" and not a photographer while Philipp Rubel owned a postcard publishing company that only sold photography. Holzer credits the author as an anonymous photographer from Sarajevo who sold the picture to Charles Trampus. Rubel acquired the rights of reproduction from Trampus, for Austria-Hungary and the German Empire, and published the photo as a postcard with the mention "Property and Publisher Philipp Rubel, Vienna" printed on the back. This information is available in the photography database of the Albertina Museum in Vienna.

Bonartes Photoinstitut found records of a legal case brought by Philipp Rubel against , a publishing house in Vienna, that printed and distributed postcards without permission. The identity of the photographer Walter Tausch and the acquisition of the rights by the publisher Rubel as well as the complaint procedure against Österreichische Zeitungsdruckerei-AG have been in public records since 15 January 1915, when the court hearing took place in Vienna. In the legal proceedings, the printer was acquitted because the image was not a portrait but a "situational picture" and no corresponding reservation was noted on the prints. According to Timm Starl author of Lexikon zur Fotografie in Österreich 1839 bis 1945 (Lexicon on photography in Austria from 1839 to 1945), the Austrian photography database, a short version of the court proceedings is available in the database "Bibliography on Photography in Austria" on the Albertina Museum website and accessible since 21 December 1998.

Other sources like the Croatian History Museum of Zagreb claim  that the author was an amateur photographer named Milos Oberajger who had found himself between the policemen and the assassin on the day of the assassination. According to the museum a written explanation in Hungarian was found on the back of the photograph.  Getty images sells a version of the image with the following credit: "The arrest of Nedeljko Cabrinovic . . . captured by amateur photographer Milos Oberajger" giving the source of the image as Topical Press Agency, a British photo agency established in 1903 and dissolved in 1957. A 2006 book called "Terrorism Essential Primary Sources" credits the same person as photographer, giving the source as the Croatian History Museum in Zagreb.

Other photographers like Carl Seebald, who was running a photo agency in Vienna, also sold the photo to the press, allegedly showing the assassin, under their own name adding to the confusion.

Publication and repercussions 
On 5 July 1914, a week after the assassination, the Austrian weekly newspaper  published the photograph on its front page, allegedly showing the Sarajevo assassin with the caption  (The assassination of the heir to the throne and his wife in Sarajevo. The arrest of the murderer Princip) without crediting the photographer. The same day, a Viennese daily, ran it with the caption “The bomb thrower Čabrinović“. A few days later, on 9 July 1914,  No. 28, the illustrated magazine of the Hamburger Nachrichten, published it as “The arrest of the assassin in Sarajevo" and credited Trampus as the photographer. Also on 9 July 1914 the largest magazine in the country  also ran the picture with the caption:  (The arrest of the 20-year-old high school student Gavro Princip, the murderer of the heir to the throne).

In 2005 the Encyclopedia of Twentieth-Century Photography published the image as "the critical moment that would trigger the war, captured in a photograph on the cover of the 9 July 1914 issue of  showing the arrest of Serbian nationalist Gavrilo Princip after he had shot the Archduke Ferdinand, heir to the Austro-Hungarian throne". The scene quickly became famous after postcards were made of it, reprinted again in newspapers around the world, and to this day also on book covers, university-level textbooks and in museums with the same caption claiming that the arrested person was the murderer Princip.

{{Gallery
|title=
|width=208 | height=221
|align=center
|File:Wiener Bilder 5 July 1914 cover.jpg
 |alt1=
 |Austrian weekly Wiener Bilder''', the first newspaper featuring the photograph captioned as the arrest of Gavrilo Princip, 5 July 1914.
|File:Postcard arrest wrongly identifying suspect Sarajevo 1914.jpg
|alt4=
|Postcard published by Philipp Rubel, printed with a caption identifying the suspect as "bomb thrower Čabrinović".
|File:Walter Tausch Hamburger Woche 1914.jpg
 |alt2=
 |Die Hamburger Woche with photo credit Trampus, 9 July 1914.
}}

On 16 June 2012, Austrian photography historian Anton Holzer published his research about the photograph of the arrest, in the Austrian daily Die Press, under the headline “The murderer who wasn't one”. Holzer found out that doubts about the subject being Princip had existed from the start, but once the image went into circulation, the story could no longer be stopped and to this day, the person arrested in the photo continues to be depicted as the assassin of Franz Ferdinand.
According to Butcher the image fit so well the narrative of the desperate assassin that countless historians, reporters, broadcasters and film-makers have continue to claim that the subject of the photograph was Princip. Christopher Clark calls it an "egregious mistake", since there is no photograph of the moment of the attack itself, the arrest photo ultimately had the status of a media substitute. The image became an icon of the 20th century after being republished as the arrest of the man who fired the shot that started the First World War.

Hans B. von Sothen, author of Photos make politics, Fakes and Manipulation'', a book on the subject of photo manipulation and photo forgery, concludes that even though the photo does not depict the assassin and there is no photo of the arrest of the actual assassin, this photo remains one of the most fascinating in world history. Christoph Hamann sees it as a visual symbol that kept the assassination and the narrative of Serbia's political responsibility in the long-term memory.

Notes

Footnotes

Citations

References

Books

Online publications

External links 

 A postcard of the arrest naming Nedeljko Čabrinović as the subject arrested.
 Database Albertina, Austrian photographic history database
 Fotogeschichte , The academic journal dedicated to photography, its history and its relationship with society.
 Photoinstitut Bonartes, The Center for Historic Photography based in Vienna.
 Postkarten Bonartes, a project initiated by the Photoinstitut Bonartes dedicated to postcards research.
 Postkartensammlung, a project of the Graz Museum, about Illustrated postcards, in partnership with Photoinstitut Bonartes.

1910s photographs
Black-and-white photographs
People notable for being the subject of a specific photograph
Assassination of Archduke Franz Ferdinand of Austria